A digital sensor is an electronic or electrochemical sensor, where data is digitally converted and transmitted. Sensors are often used for analytical measurements, e.g. the measurement of chemical and physical properties of liquids. Typical measured parameters are pH value, conductivity, oxygen, redox potentials, and others. Such measurements are used in the industrialized world and give vital input for process control.

Sensors of analogue type were used in the past, but today more and more digital sensors are used. This article describes the difference between them and discusses the reason for the development of digital sensors.

General aspects
Digital sensors are the modern successors of analog sensors. Digital sensors replace analog sensors stepwise, because they overcome the traditional drawbacks of analog sensor systems (cf chapter 3)

History
Electronic and electrochemical sensors are typically one part of a measuring chain. A measuring chain comprises the sensor itself, a cable, and a transmitter. 
In the traditional analog systems, the sensor converts the measuring parameter (e.g. pH value) into an analog electrical signal. This analog electrical signal is connected to a transmitter via a cable. The transmitter transforms the electrical signal into a readable form (display, current outputs, bus data transmission, etc.). 

The sensor and the cable often are not connected permanently, but through electrical connectors. 
This classical design with connectors and transmission of small currents through a cable has four main drawbacks: 
a) Humidity and corrosion of the connector falsify the signal. 
b) The cable must be shielded and of very high quality to prevent the measuring signal from being altered by electromagnetic noise. 
c) The sensor can only be calibrated or adjusted when installed, because the influence of the cable (length, ohmic resistance, impedance) cannot be neglected. 
d) The cable length is limited.

Use and design
Digital sensors have been developed to overcome the traditional disadvantages of analog sensors.
Digital sensors are mainly used in water and industrial processes. They measure parameters such as pH, redox potential, conductivity, dissolved oxygen, ammonium, nitrate, SAC, turbidity. 
A digital sensor system also consists of the sensor itself, a cable, and a transmitter. The differences to analog sensor systems are: 
a) The sensor has an electronic chip. The measuring signal is directly converted into a digital signal inside the sensor. The data transmission through the cable is also digital. This digital data transmission is not sensitive to cable length, cable resistance or impedance, and is not influenced by electromagnetic noise. Standard cables can be used. 
b) The connection between sensor and cable can be contactless and done by inductive coupling. Humidity and related corrosion is no longer an issue. Alternative fibre optic cables may also be an option for long or electromagnetically hostile connections.
c) The sensor can be calibrated apart from the system.

References 

H. Galster: pH-Messung, VCH Verlagsgesellschaft mbH,  
C.H. Hamann, W. Vielstich: Elektrochemie I, Verlag Chemie,  
Schröter / Lautenschläger / Bibrack: Taschenbuch der Chemie, Verlag Harri Deutsch,  
U. Tietze, Ch. Schenk: Halbleiter-Schaltungstechnik, Springer Verlag, 

Sensors